Nationality words link to articles with information on the nation's poetry or literature (for instance, Irish or France).

Events
 1442 – Enea Piccolomini, the future Pope Pius II, arrives at the court of Frederick III, Holy Roman Emperor, in Vienna, who names him imperial poet.
 1445 – Printing press developed in Europe

Works published
1445:
 Cancionero de Baena, the first collection of Castilian lyrics, Spain

1449:
 Amoryus and Cleopes, poem by John Metham, English adaptation of the Pyramus and Thisbe narrative from Ovid‘s Metamorphoses

Births
Death years link to the corresponding "[year] in poetry" article:

1440:
 Lorenzo de' Medici, born January 1 (died 1492), Italian banker, politician, patron of the arts and poet who wrote in his native Tuscan language
 Martial d'Auvergne (died 1500), French
 Hans Folz born sometime from 1435 to this year (died 1513), German
 Blind Harry, also known as "Henry the Minstrel", born about this year (died 1492), Scottish makar (poet)
 Kabir (died 1518), mystic poet and saint of India
 Lorenzo Lippi (of Cole) (died 1485), Italian, Latin-language poet
 Jorge Manrique (died 1479), Spanish poet
 Paolo Marsi (died 1484), Italian, Latin-language poet
 Molla, also known as "Mollamamba", both popular names of Atukuri Molla (died 1530), Indian poet who wrote Telugu Ramayan; a woman
 Ludovico Pontico born about this year (died 1520), Italian, Latin-language poet
 Giorgio Sisgoreo born about this year (died  c. 1510), Italian, Latin-language poet
 Francesco Uberti (humanist) (died 1518), Italian, Latin-language poet

1441:
 Mir Ali Shir Nava'i (died 1501), Persian or Turkish poet and scholar

1442:
 Amerigo Corsini (died 1501), Italian, Latin-language poet
 Pietro Antonio Piatti born about this year (died  after 1508), Italian, Latin-language poet

1443:
 Matteo Canale (died 1503), Italian, Latin-language poet

1444:
 Pandolfo Collenuccio (died 1504), Italian, Latin-language poet

1445:
 Cantalicio (died 1515), Italian, Latin-language poet
 Bartolomeo Fonzio born about this year (died 1513), Italian, Latin-language poet

1446:
 Domizio Calderini (died 1478), Italian, Latin-language poet
 Ippolita Maria Sforza (died 1484), Italian noblewoman and writer
 Robert Wydow (died 1505), English poet, church musician, and religious figure

1447:
 Baptista Mantuanus, also known as "Battista Mantovano" and "Johannes Baptista Spagnolo"  (died 1516), Italian Carmelite reformer, humanist and  Latin-language poet

1448:
 Johannes von Soest (died 1506), German composer, theorist and poet

1449:
 Quinto Emiliano Cimbriaco born about this year (died 1499), Italian, Latin-language poet
 Antonio Geraldini born about this year (died 1489), Italian, Latin-language poet
 Aldo Manuzio (died 1515), Italian, Latin-language poet

Deaths
Birth years link to the corresponding "[year] in poetry" article:

1440:
 Cuacuauhtzin (born 1410), Aztec lord and poet in the Pre-Columbian nahua world
 Nund Reshi (born 1377), Indian, Kashmiri-language poet

1442:
 Nguyễn Trãi (born 1388), Vietnamese Confucian scholar, poet, politician and tactician

1443:
 Tomas af Strangnas, Swedish

1444:
 Andreu Febrer died about this year (born c. 1375), Catalan Spanish translator of the Divine Comedy

1448:
 Vidyapati, also known as Vidyapati Thakur and called Maithil Kavi Kokil "the poet cuckoo of Maithili", died about this year (born c. 1352), Indian, Maithili-language poet and Sanskrit writer

See also

 Poetry
 15th century in poetry
 15th century in literature

Notes

15th-century poetry
Poetry